The fifth and final season of the American television comedy series Louie premiered on April 9, 2015, and concluded on May 28, 2015. It consists of eight episodes, each running approximately 23 minutes in length. FX broadcast the fifth season on Thursdays at 10:30 pm in the United States. The season was produced by 3 Arts Entertainment and the executive producers were Louis C.K., Dave Becky and M. Blair Breard.

Louie was created, written and directed by Louis C.K., who stars as a fictionalized version of himself, a comedian and divorced father raising his two daughters in New York City. The show has a loose format atypical for television comedy series, consisting of largely unconnected storylines and segments (described as "extended vignettes") that revolve around Louie's life, punctuated by live stand-up performances.

Production
Louie was renewed by FX for a fifth season in July 2014 with a seven-episode order. When FX announced the season's premiere date in January 2015, it was announced the season would consist of eight episodes instead of thirteen or fourteen. It was later revealed by Louis C.K. during a panel to promote the show that the shortened season length was due to an unfortunate decision he made while high on marijuana. In January 2015, C.K. spoke about the writing and tone of the season, "This season is more laugh-centric and funny than season four. The feeling I was having when I wrote the season...was a goofy and playful feeling." The fifth season features the return of the opening credits and theme song, which were absent in the fourth season.

Cast

Main cast
 Louis C.K. as Louie

Recurring cast

Guest stars

Episodes

Reception

Critical response
The fifth season of Louie has received acclaim from critics. On Rotten Tomatoes, the season has a rating of 92%, based on 38 reviews, with the site's critical consensus reading, "A renewed focus on the show's singular blend of sincerity and hilarity keep Louie at the top of its game." On Metacritic, the season has a score of 91 out of 100, based on 20 critics, indicating "universal acclaim".

Sonia Saraiya of Salon wrote that "Louie is a treasure" and that season 5 of the show "is as confident and distinctive as ever, a sitcom that is not quite like anything else on television". James Poniewozik of Time wrote that season 5 is "by and large, blisteringly funny" and "also poignant", stating that "Louie has again successfully reinvented itself, this time as what it used to be." Brian Lowry of Variety praised the series and wrote, "Almost nothing else on TV — certainly in half-hour form — rivals the particularity of C.K.'s approach, which has garnered the kind of well-deserved accolades that have kept FX quietly humming that 'Brother Louie' tune."

Accolades
For the 67th Primetime Emmy Awards, the series received nominations for Outstanding Comedy Series, Louis C.K. for Outstanding Lead Actor in a Comedy Series, and Pamela Adlon for Outstanding Guest Actress in a Comedy Series. C.K. also received nominations for Outstanding Writing for a Comedy Series for "Bobby's House" and Outstanding Directing for a Comedy Series for "Sleepover". For the 22nd Screen Actors Guild Awards, Louie C.K. was nominated for Best Comedy Actor. For the 68th Directors Guild of America Awards, Louis C.K. was nominated for Outstanding Directing – Comedy Series for "Sleepover".

References

External links
 

2015 American television seasons